Grand, Great or Chief Župan (zoupanos megas) is the English rendering of a South Slavic Serbian title which relate etymologically to Župan (originally a pater familias, later the tribal chief of a unit called župa).

Bulgaria 

A decorated silver cup with a Medieval Greek inscription attests to the use of the title in 9th-century Bulgaria. The inscription refers to a certain Sivin, who appears to have held that position at the time of Kniaz Boris I (852–889). Sivin was among the Bulgarian boyars who supported the official Christianization, as the subsequently added line "May God help" suggests.

Serbia 
 
In the Middle Ages, the Serbian veliki župan (велики жупан) was the supreme chieftain in the multi-tribal society. The title signifies overlordship as the leader of lesser chieftains titled župan. It was used by the Serb rulers in the 11th and 12th centuries. In Greek, it was known as archizoupanos (ἄρχιζουπάνος), megazoupanos (μεγαζουπάνος) and megalos zoupanos (μεγάλος ζουπάνος).

In the 1090s, Vukan became the veliki župan in Raška (Rascia). Stefan Nemanja expelled his brother Tihomir in 1168 and assumed the title of veliki župan, as described in the Charter of Hilandar. A Latin document used mega iupanus for King Stefan the First-Crowned. Afterwards, it was a high noble rank with notable holders such as Altoman Vojinović ( 1335–59).

It was used in the Kingdom of Serbs, Croats and Slovenes (1922–29) as a governmental title for the head of the oblast (an administrative division), the state being divided into 33 oblasts.

References

Further reading
Ćirković, S. (1999) Veliki župan 1. in: Ćirković S.i R.Mihaljčić [ed.] Leksikon srpskog srednjeg veka, Beograd, str. 73
Mihaljčić, R. (1999) Veliki župan 2. in: Ćirković S.i R.Mihaljčić [ed.] Leksikon srpskog srednjeg veka, Beograd, str. 73

Heads of state
Serbian noble titles
Bulgarian noble titles